Swarajyarakshak  Sambhaji is an Indian historical drama based on the life of warrior king Sambhaji. The series is directed by Vivek Deshpande and Kartik Rajaram Kendhe and is written by Pratap Gangavane. It is produced by Amol Kolhe, Vilas Sawant and Sonali Ghanashyam Rao under the banner of Jagadamb Creations.

Plot 
Sambhaji, son of Shivaji is a warrior who fights for Swarajya self rule and becomes a Maratha Chhatrapati. Sambhaji loses his mother at the age of two and grows up under the influence of his grandmother Jijabai. His battle for self-rule begins when he meets Mirza Raje and a nine-year-old. After escaping from Agra, he travels from Mathura to Raigad Fort, the Marathi capital, on his own. He is then married to Jivubai; per Maratha custom, she takes the name Yesubai.

Six or seven years later, Sambhaji becomes the prince of Swarajya. He proves himself an excellent general by defeating Kayum Khan's army in his first battle and is widely praised. Foreign powers take note of his intelligence and skills, which include writing four books in Sanskrit. After the birth of Rajaram I, family disputes begin to rise within the empire. Corrupt ministers led by Annaji Datto (who holds a grudge against Sambhaji, who has called him out for his corruption) rekindle Maharani Soyarabai's ambition to make her son Rajaram, the younger son of Shivaji, the next Chatrapati. Sambhaji's life is filled with accusations and insults. While Sambhaji is stationed at Shringarpur as the governor of Prabhanvalli, poet, warrior, and old acquaintance Kavi Kalash becomes his closest friend. Sambhaji handles the responsibility well and raises a new army of recruits in Shringarpur. When Shivaji sets out on his southern conquest, he sends Sambhaji into the Mughal camp of Diler Khan, faking a rebellion by Sambhaji. This keeps the Mughals away from Swarajya for two years, while Shivaji completes his Southern conquest. Soon after, Shivaji dies at Raigad.

After the death of Shivaji, Annaji Datto Sachiv and other key ministers, supported by Rajmata Soyarabai, conspire against Sambhaji to prevent his accession. They crown the 10-year-old Rajaram without informing Sambhaji of his father's demise. However, Hambirrao Mohite (the brother of Soyrabai and uncle of Rajaram), the commander-in-chief of the Maratha army supports Sambhaji. With his help, Sambhaji captures the conspirators and takes the control of Raigad Fort. He spends a few months reforming the administration of Swarajya. He solves the problems of poor people. Sambhaji then crowns himself second Chatrapati of the Maratha Empire. At his coronation, Sambhaji pardons all the conspirators and reinstates their posts in consideration of their contribution to the Swarajya.

Mughal Emperor Aurangzeb is bent on destroying the Swarajya. Sambhaji anticipates a Mughal invasion and deals a severe blow to the Mughal Empire by plundering the rich city of Burhanpur. The audacity and military genius of Sambhaji shocks even Aurangzeb. He decides to invade the Maratha Empire immediately. He is further enraged when one of his rebel sons, Akbar, joins hands with Sambhaji. Aurangzeb, hell bent on finishing the Maratha Kingdom invades the Swarajya with a massive army of 500,000 soldiers. Sambhaji has only 60,000-70,000 men at his disposal. An unequal clash begins. Aurangzeb tries to attack the Swarajya from all directions but a skilled Sambhaji and his generals foil all his attempts through the strategy of 'Ganimi kava' (Guirella Warfare). Aurangzeb joins hands with other enemies of the Maratha Empire such as the Siddis of Janjira, Portuguese of Goa and Chikkadevaraja of Mysore in order to Encircle the small Maratha Kingdom from all directions. 

Sambhaji defeats all of these rulers in successive and brilliant campaigns. Sambhaji almost captured the fort of Janjira in his famous Siege of Janjira (1682). Later he defeats the powerful king of Mysore Chikka Devaraja a superb campaign in southern India (Maratha-Mysore War (1682)). Then he proceeds to defeat the Portuguese and almost captured the entire region of Goa in his victorious campaign of Maratha invasion of Goa (1683). Aurangzeb is frustrated, and he uses every possible trick for defeating Sambhaji but he is not able to do so. Aurangzeb's generals attack the fort of Ramsej (Siege of Ramsej) but they are not able to win the fort due to a gallant defence from the Fort's commander. Aurangzeb's generals are defeated everywhere in the Maratha region. Aurangzeb's frustration increases, so he tries to entice some of Sambhaji's relatives to join his side. Some of Sambhaji's relatives join Aurangzeb's forces. Aurangzeb attacks and finishes off Sambhaji's allies, namely the Adilshahi of Bijapur and Qutb Shahi of Golconda. Later, Aurangzeb invades the Maratha territories with renewed vigor. In a crucial battle at Wai, Sambhaji's main general Hambirrao Mohite is killed despite a Maratha Victory. After this Aurangzeb uses treachery to entice greedy maratha sardars to his side. Sambhaji loses some of his support as some sardars desert him to join Aurangzeb. Aurangzeb tries to capture the fort of Panhala through treachery but Sambhaji arrives in time and foils the attempt.

In the midst of this family issues outsiders such as Siddi, Portuguese, British; all of them became kingdom's fierce enemies. Despite that Sambhaji shows his brilliance and attacks Aurangzeb's camp to distract him. Aurangzeb is on the verge of losing the war. Finally the Mughal General Muqarrab Khan captures Sambhaji Raje and Kavi Kalash with the help of Sambhaji's brother in law Ganoji Shirke.The King who is captured by Aurangzeb is taken to Bahadurgad, where Aurangzeb humiliates them by parading them wearing clown's clothes and they were subjected to insults by Mughal soldiers. After that, Aurangzeb ordered Sambhaji Raje and Kavi Kalash to be tortured to death; the process took over a fortnight and included plucking out their eyes and tongue, pulling out their nails and removing their skin. After being brutally tortured, Sambhaji Raje was finally killed on 11 March 1689. Aurangzeb thinks that he has ended the Maratha state once and for all, however he is proved wrong. The Marathas regroup under the leadership of Chhatrapati Rajaram and later by Rani Tarabai. They badly defeat the Mughals and make Aurangzeb's last years his worst years. The Mughals are defeated and the Marathas now start expanding. It wouldn't have been possible without Sambhaji.

Cast
 Amol Kolhe as Sambhaji
 Divesh Medge as child Sambhaji
 Prajakta Gaikwad as Yesubai
 Aabha Bodas as child Yesubai
 Shantanu Moghe as Shivaji
 Prateeksha Lonkar as Jijabai
 Rahul Mehendale as Kavi Kalash
 Dinesh Kanande as Pant
 Anil Gavas as Sarsenapati Hambirrao Mohite
 Mahesh Kokate as Annaji Datto Sachiv
 Satish Salagare as Somaji Datto
 Nasir Khan as Balaji Chitre
 Amit Behl as Aurangzeb
 Anand Kale as Kondaji Farzand
 Poorva Gokhale as Saibai
 Pallavi Vaidya as Putalabai
 Snehlata Tawade-Vasaikar as Soyarabai
 Sharvari Jamenis as Sakvarbai
 Tanvi Kulkarni as Sagunabai
 Latika Sawant as Dharau
 Ashwini Mahangade as Ranubai 
 Pradnesh Tari as Rajaram
 Mruga Bodas as Tarabai
 Priya Marathe as Godavari
 Nandkumar Patil as Moropant Trimbak Pingle
 Sumeet Pusavale as Harjiraje Mahadik
 Ramesh Rokade as Hiroji Farzand
 Ajay Tapkire as Bahirji Naik
 Ravindra Kulkarni as Niraji Raavji
 Vijay Andalkar as Krishnaji Jadhav
 Kishor Mahabole as Firangoji Narsale
 Swarangi Marathe as Lavangibai
 Amit Bhanushali as Akbar
 Amruta Malwadkar as Ambikabai Mahadik
 Kaushik Kulkarni as Nilopant

Production 
The lead actor Amol Kolhe who played the role of Sambhaji Raje won the special best actor award in Zee Marathi Awards 2018.

Special episode

1 hour
 15 April 2018
 22 July 2018
 9 December 2018
 19 May 2019
 27 October 2019

2 hours
 24 September 2017 (Starting Episode)
 17 December 2017 (Elder Sambhaji)

Reception 
The series premiered on 24 September 2017 from Monday to Saturday at 9 pm by replacing Kahe Diya Pardes.

Ratings

References

External links 
 
 Swarajyarakshak Sambhaji at ZEE5

Indian historical television series
Indian period television series
Television series set in the 17th century
Zee Marathi original programming
Marathi-language television shows
2017 Indian television series debuts
2020 Indian television series endings